Two Mexican stations bear the callsign XHEBC, both in Ensenada, Baja California:

XHEBC-FM 97.9 FM, "Ke Buena"
XHEBC-TDT virtual channel 57, transmitter for Las Estrellas